The Tremellomycetes are a class of dimorphic fungi in the Agaricomycotina. Some species have gelatinous basidiocarps (fruiting bodies) or (microscopically) a sacculate parenthesome. There are six orders, 17 families, and 39 genera in the Tremellomycetes. Tremellomycetes include yeasts, dimorphic taxa, and species that form complex fruiting bodies. Tremellomycetes include some fungi that are human and animal pathogens in the genera Cryptococcus, Naganishia, Papiliotrema, and Trichosporon and some fungi that are cultivated for food in the genera Tremella and Naematelia.

References

 
Basidiomycota classes